The Gambler's lament (or "Gamester's lament")  is one of the hymns of the Rigveda which do not have any direct cultic or religious context. 
It is found in the late Tenth Book (RV 10.34), where most of such hymns on "miscellaneous" topics are found, suggesting a date of compilation corresponding to the early Indian Iron Age. The hymn was composed by either Kanvasha Ailusha or Aksha Maujavant.

Moriz Winternitz considered the poem to be the "most beautiful among the non–religious poems of the Rig Veda." Arthur Anthony Macdonell writes the following about the poem: "Considering that it is the oldest composition of the kind in existence, we cannot but regard this poem as the most remarkable literary product." 

The poem consists of a monologue of a repentant gambler who laments the ruin brought on him because of addiction to dice. The poem is didactic in nature and shows early indications of the proverbial and sententious poetry in later Hindu texts. Arthur Llewellyn Basham believed that Gambler's Lament was originally constructed as a spell to ensure victory in a game of dice, which was later converted into a cautionary poem by an anonymous poet.

The poem testifies to the popularity of gambling among all classes of Vedic people, however it was most important among the kings and ruling class. In the middle Vedic Rajasuya ritual (consecration of a king), a ritual dice game is played in which the game is rigged so that the king-to-be wins. In the later Hindu epic, the Mahabharata, Yudhiṣṭhira gambles away his kingdom, brothers, wife, and himself to his cousins. The Mahabharata also mentions the story of Nala and Damayanti, in which Nala gambles away his kingdom. The dharmic texts, which also date to a later period, consider gambling to be a typical trait and vice of kings.

The gambling dice (akșa) were made from nuts of Terminalia bellirica (Vibhīdaka), into an oblong shape with four scoring sides— kŗta (four), tretā (trey), dvāpar (deuce), kali (ace). The gambler who drew a multiple of four won the game.

Contents 
The hymn consists of 14 verses in the tristubh meter.
In verses 2–3, the narrator describes how the dice have ruined his domestic life (trans. Stephanie W. Jamison and Joel P. Brereton, 2014: 

The poem then describes the lure of the dice: 

The dice are referred to as "the brown ones", as they were made from the brown nuts of Terminalia bellirica.

In the following verses the dice are described as "deceptive, hot and burning" and being similar to children in that "they give and take again". In verse 13, the poet addresses the gambler in an attempt to reform him, invoking the god Savitr.

See also 
Rigvedic dialogue hymns
Gambler's conceit
Problem gambling

References

Sources

External links
RV 10.34 at sacred-texts.com

Hindu texts
Rigveda
Sanskrit texts
Vedic hymns
Indian poems
Works about gambling
Gambling in ancient history